Rowena is an unincorporated community in Audrain County, Missouri, United States.

History
A post office called Rowena was established in 1884, and remained in operation until 1912. The community was named after Hiley Rowe, a local merchant.

References

Unincorporated communities in Audrain County, Missouri
Unincorporated communities in Missouri